Eghosa Imasuen (born May 19, 1976) is a Nigerian writer of Bini descent. He is also a medical doctor. He is the author of To Saint Patrick and Fine Boys, published by the Farafina imprint of Kachifo Limited, publishers of the Nigerian editions of Chimamanda Ngozi Adichie's novels.

He lives in Lagos, Nigeria, where he runs a new publishing outfit called  Narrative Landscape Press.

References

Nigerian male novelists
Living people
1976 births
21st-century Nigerian novelists